Kyapanak may refer to:
Musayelyan, Akhuryan, Armenia, formerly Mets Kyapanak
Ovit, Armenia, formerly Pokr Kyapanak